The 15th Venice International Film Festival was held from 22 August to 7 September 1954. Writer Ignazio Silone was appointed as president of the jury. The Golden Lion was awarded to Romeo and Juliet, directed by Renato Castellani.

Jury
Main Competition (Venezia 15)
Ignazio Silone, Italian writer (Jury President)
Bengt Idestam-Almquist, Swedish screenwriter
Louis Chauvet, French writer and journalist
Carlos Fernández Cuenca, Spanish journalist, film critic and historian
Roger Manvell, British film historian
Mario Gromo, Italian journalist and film critic
Pasquale Ojetti, Italian journalist and film critic
Piero Regnoli, Italian screenwriter and film director
Filippo Sacchi, Italian journalist and film critic

Official selection

In Competition
The following films were selected for the main international competition:

Highlighted title indicates Golden Lion winner.

Awards

Official selection
The following official awards were presented at the 15th edition:

In Competition
Golden Lion: Romeo and Juliet by Renato Castellani
Grand Jury Prize: Executive Suite by Robert Wise
Silver Lion:
Sansho the Bailiff by Kenji Mizoguchi
La Strada by Federico Fellini
On the Waterfront by Elia Kazan
Seven Samurai by Akira Kurosawa
Volpi Cup for Best Actor: Jean Gabin for Touchez Pas au Grisbi and The Air of Paris

References

External links

1954 film festivals
1954 in Italy
Venice Film Festival
Film
August 1954 events in Europe
September 1954 events in Europe